Be the Cowboy Tour was a concert tour by Japanese-American singer-songwriter Mitski, in support of her fifth studio album Be the Cowboy (2018). The tour began on August 12, 2018, in Providence, Rhode Island, United States and concluded on September 8, 2019, in New York City.

Background
In mid-2018, Mitski embarked on a concert tour called A Solo Tour of Beautiful Places. She visited cities that she did not usually get to play on tour in United States where she played solo without full-band. On June 4, 2018, she announced the European and North American tour dates, in support of Be the Cowboy. Katie Von Schleicher, Caroline Rose, EERA and Jessica Lea Mayfield were announced as the tour openers. On August 2, 2018, Mitski expanded North American tour with the opening act Sidney Gish. Mitski was announced to perform at the 2019 St Jerome's Laneway Festival, touring Australia and New Zealand, as well as sideshows. On November 26, 2018, she announced the tour dates in Asia, set in February 2019. She then announced additional tour dates in North America, Asia and Europe, alongside festival appearances.

Set list
This set list is from the concert on December 1, 2018, in Brooklyn. It is not intended to represent all tour dates.

"Remember My Name"
"I Don't Smoke"
"Washing Machine Heart"
"First Love / Late Spring"
"Francis Forever"
"Me and My Husband"
"Dan the Dancer"
"Once More to See You"
"A Pearl"
"Thursday Girl"
"I Will"
"Townie"
"Nobody"
"I Bet on Losing Dogs"
"I Want You"
"Your Best American Girl"
"Why Didn't You Stop Me?"
"Geyser"
"Happy"
"Come into the Water"
"Drunk Walk Home"
"A Burning Hill"
"My Body's Made of Crushed Little Stars"

Encore
"Two Slow Dancers"
"Goodbye, My Danish Sweetheart"

Tour dates

Notes

References

2018 concert tours
2019 concert tours